The 1998 Speedway Grand Prix of Czech Republic was the first race of the 1998 Speedway Grand Prix season. It took place on 15 May in the Markéta Stadium in Prague, Czech Republic It was the second Czech Republic SGP and was won by Swedish rider Tony Rickardsson. It was the first win of his career.

Starting positions draw 

The Speedway Grand Prix Commission nominated Antonín Kasper, Jr., Bohumil Brhel (both from Czech Republic) and Gerd Riss (from Germany) as Wild Card.
Draw 20.  (20) Sebastian Ułamek →  (25) Peter Karlsson

Heat details

The intermediate classification

See also 
 Speedway Grand Prix
 List of Speedway Grand Prix riders

References

External links 
 FIM-live.com
 SpeedwayWorld.tv

C
Speedway Grand Prix
1998